Pasadena is a city in Los Angeles County, California, United States.

Pasadena may also refer to:

Places

Australia
Pasadena, South Australia, a suburb of Adelaide in the City of Mitcham

Canada
Pasadena, Newfoundland and Labrador, an incorporated town

United States
East Pasadena, California, a census-designated place in Los Angeles County
South Pasadena, California, a city in Los Angeles County
Pasadena, Florida, a neighborhood of St. Petersburg, a city in Pinellas County
South Pasadena, Florida, a city in Pinellas County
Pasadena, Lexington, a neighborhood in Lexington, Fayette County, Kentucky
Pasadena, Maryland, a census-designated place in Anne Arundel County
Pasadena Hills, Missouri, a city in St. Louis County
Pasadena Park, Missouri, a village in St. Louis County
Pasadena, Texas, a city in Harris County

Entertainment
Pasadena (album), released in 2007 by rock band Ozma
"Pasadena" (song), a 1972 single by Australian singer John Paul Young
Pasadena (TV series), a 2001 American primetime soap opera 
"Pasadena", or "Home in Pasadena", a 1923 song by Harry Warren
"Pasadena", a 1981 single by Maywood (duo)
"Pasadena", a 2021 single by Tinashe featuring Buddy
Pasadena O'Possum, a character in the Crash Bandicoot video-game series

Other
USS Pasadena, a list of US Navy ships with the name
Pasadena ("Perfect All-Singing All-Dancing Editorial and Notation Application"), an application for editing the Oxford English Dictionary

See also
The Pasadenas, an R&B/pop group from the United Kingdom